This is a list of listed buildings in the burgh of Inverness in the Highland council area, Scotland.
For listed buildings outwith the burgh, see List of listed buildings in Inverness and Bona.

List 

|}

Key

See also 
 List of listed buildings in Inverness and Bona
 List of listed buildings in Highland

Notes

References
 All entries, addresses and coordinates are based on data from Historic Scotland. This data falls under the Open Government Licence

Inverness
 
Inverness-related lists